Nikolaos Davelis (Greek: Νικόλαος Νταβέλης) was a significant Greek participant in the Macedonian Struggle.

Biography 
Davelis was born and raised in Livadia, Kilkis in the 1880s. His family was well known for their national war participations which dates back to 1821. He formed and led an armed group. He collaborated with his fellow soldiers Stergios Naoum, Anastasios Bellis Kulina and Nikolaos Nessios. He also worked with Konstantinos Garefis several times. In 1906, in the Battle of Valia Siaca, between Livadia and Ossiani (now Archangelos), he was arrested with other Macedonomachoi by the Ottoman authorities and imprisoned in Heptapyrgion of Thessaloniki. In 1908, with the revolution of the Young Turks, a general amnesty was granted and he was freed.

References 
 Ρετζίκι, αναδρομές,στο παρελθόν,το παρόν και το μέλλον,αυτού του τόπου, Κωνσταντίνος Γεωργιάδης, Πευκονέα, 3 November 2008
 Άγγελος Κ. Ανεστόπουλος, Ο Μακεδονικός Αγών 1903-1908: και n συµβολή των κατοίκων εις την απελευθέρωσιν της Μακεδονίας, Thessaloniki 1965, publication Σύνδεσµος Γραµµάτων και Τεχνών Νομού Κοζάνης, t. Β', p. 91
 Ιωάννης Σ. Κολιόπουλος (επιστημονική επιμέλεια), Αφανείς, γηγενείς Μακεδονομάχοι, Εταιρεία Μακεδονικών Σπουδών, University Studio Press, Thessaloniki, 2008, p. 95
 Φ. Κιλιπίρης, Χοάρα Μουσιάτα - Τα Λιβάδια του Πάικου, ο τόπος - η ιστορία - οι άνθρωποι, Kilkis 2009

Greek people of the Macedonian Struggle
Prisoners and detainees of the Ottoman Empire
People from Kilkis (regional unit)